The Medicine Wheel/Medicine Mountain National Historic Landmark (formerly known as the Bighorn Medicine Wheel) is a medicine wheel located in the Bighorn National Forest, in the U.S. state of Wyoming.
The Medicine Wheel at Medicine Mountain is a large stone structure made of local white limestone laid upon a bedrock of limestone. It is both a place of sacred ceremony and scientific inquiry. In Native Science these uses are not distinguished as separate as they are in Western science.

The cultural history of the Big Horn Mountains, home to the Big Horn Medicine Wheel, dates back over ten thousand years.

Cultural Purposes

No indigenous people have publicly claimed to have built the Big Horn Medicine Wheel. During negotiations to include the Big Horn Medicine Wheel to the registry for National Historic Landmark and Sacred Site status, the Crow stated that the Wheel was already present when they came into the area. However, the Wheel rests within the Crow homeland, an area that the Crow say was given to them by the Creator when No Vitals, the visionary Crow Leader (circa 1400–1600), had his vision of stars descending into tobacco blossoms while he fasted and prayed on the highest mountain in the Bighorns (Cloud Peak). Oral history from several indigenous nations sets the Big Horn Medicine Wheel as already existing, having been built by "ancient ancestors" or "people without iron."

The Big Horn Medicine Wheel is a sacred site to many people of many nations. Although the Wheel was built high above the Bighorn Basin,  and the climb up from the basin takes effort, a wide and deep cut ancient trail takes the traveler directly to the Wheel. In winter, when the modern asphalt road is covered in snow and closed for the season, one can still make one's way by foot up the old trail from Five Springs Campground. Stephen C. Simms of the Chicago Field Museum, upon examining the Wheel in 1903, surmised that the travois trail (road) must have been well-traveled for long periods in the past to acquire its deeply cut edges. The Bighorn Mountains are high above the hot summers of the basin. In 1887, the Tukudeka Elder Aggretta said her people chose to live high in the Bighorns to escape the flies and human conflict.

Little People and Vision Quests

The Arapaho call the Big Horn Medicine Wheel "Hiieeinoonotii." A detailed account of ceremonial use of the Bighorn Medicine Wheel by the Arapaho was related in 1993 by Paul Moss in a landmark of Native American oral tradition.

Tom Yellowtail (Crow) told the story of Burnt Face building a medicine wheel in the Bighorn Mountains and receiving help from the Little People. After the Little People healed his face, Burnt Face came down from the Bighorns, rejoined his people, and built what is now called the Fort Smith Wheel. This Wheel has similar stellar and solar alignments to the Big Horn Medicine Wheel, adjusted for landscape changes and latitude.

Measurements 
The structure is located at an altitude of 9642 ft (2939 meters), near the summit of Medicine Mountain. It is a precolumbian structure, built from roughly loaf-sized stones gathered from the surrounding area. The structure consists of a circular rim, 80 ft (24.3 meters) in diameter, 28 spokes extending from the rim to the center, and a series of seven stone circles (cairns). Cairn O is at the center of the structure and is about 10 ft (near 3 meters) in diameter. Cairns A – F are at or near the rim, and are considerably smaller.

Astronomical Alignments

The Big Horn Medicine Wheel is one of four or five astronomically complex wheels that are publicly known to  exist in the Rocky Mountain region.  It is of a type termed Subgroup 6, "A prominent central stone cairn surrounded by a stone ring. Two or more interior stone lines connect the stone ring to the cairn." by John Brumley. Another of this Subgroup type is the Majorville Wheel in Alberta, Canada. The Majorville Wheel with a similar complex design matching the Big Horn Medicine Wheel has been dated archaeologically to 3200 BC.   Smaller, less complex wheels may have astronomical significance, such as solstice alignments and east-west orientations. The larger complex wheels are capable of tracking several different cosmic cycles, including the precession of the equinoxes, the Moon's phases, lunar and solar eclipse cycles, and planets' orbital cycles. These astronomical wheels mirror the north ecliptic polar region of the sky and are useful as celestial grids to track changes over millennial time periods.

Astronomer John Eddy investigated the Big Horn Medicine Wheel's structure in 1972 and made a number of important discoveries, publishing his findings in Astronomical Alignment of the Big Horn Medicine Wheel, Science 184 (1974): 1031–43.<ref>Astronomical Alignment of the Big Horn Medicine Wheel, Science 184 (1974): 1031–43</ref> He found that cairns E and O were aligned in the direction of summer solstice sunrise, using cairn E for a backsight and cairn O as a foresight, and that cairns C and O were aligned in the direction of summer solstice sunset, using C as a backsight and O as a foresight.

Further, he found that cairn pairs FO, FA, and FB correspond to the rising points of the stars Sirius, Aldebaran, and Rigel, respectively. Observing the first yearly heliacal rising of these stars would have been an effective tool for determining the progress of the solar year, as the first heliacal rise of a star occurs on the same date (relative to the solstices) each year.

Rising positions of stars change very slowly over the centuries, due to the Earth's precession, so the directions of these cairn pairs can be used to project at what date they aligned best with the rising points of these stars. The FA Aldebaran alignment would have worked best between AD 1200 and AD 1700. Further, precession changes the date of first helical rise: Although today the first heliacal rise of Aldebaran is a few days after the summer solstice, between AD 1200 and 1700, the first heliacal rise of Aldebaran would have been just before the summer solstice, allowing an observer to predict the coming of this event.

Astronomer Jack Robinson from the University of South Florida has further proposed that cairn pair FD'' was used to observe the rising of the star Fomalhaut, which would have lined up with its rising point between AD 1050 and AD 1450, when Fomalhaut had its first heliacal rise roughly a month before the summer solstice. A carbon date for the Bighorn Medicine Wheel comes from a piece of wood found in cairn F, corresponding to an age of no more than 220 years, roughly in the middle of the 18th century. However, this date can only be considered as a minimum age, as the wood may have become lodged in the cairn after construction. Stated by Don Grey in his, "Summary Report," page 317 of the 1958 Wyoming Archaeology Society's excavation of the Wheel, "In the large cairn on the northwest side of the structure was found a piece of wood pinned down between the courses of stone in the wall. A sample was taken…for dating."

Other Wheels

In 1903, Stephen Simms of the Chicago Field Museum published a scientific paper on his visit to the Wheel. His diagram looks only slightly similar to the Big Horn Medicine Wheel that is now a Historic Landmark.  More than one medicine wheel existed in the Bighorn Mountains previous to 1916. Cut Ear, a Crow guide, would accompany people to wheels in the Bighorn Mountains. One article in the Sheridan Post talks of finding another wheel about 60miles from the first wheel.

Name Change

The site was declared a National Historic Landmark in 1970, and renamed as the Medicine Wheel/Medicine Mountain National Historic Landmark in 2011.

References

External links

 Medicine Wheel National Historic Landmark at the Wyoming State Historic Preservation Office
 A Report on the Medicine Wheel
 Medicine Wheel/Medicine Mountain NHL District

National Historic Landmarks in Wyoming
Buildings and structures in Big Horn County, Wyoming
Medicine wheels
Properties of religious function on the National Register of Historic Places in Wyoming
Bighorn National Forest
National Register of Historic Places in Big Horn County, Wyoming
Archaeological sites on the National Register of Historic Places in Wyoming